Vichai Sanghamkichakul (born 22 August 1947) is a Thai former footballer who competed in the 1968 Summer Olympics.

References

External links
 

1947 births
Living people
Vichai Sanghamkichakul
Vichai Sanghamkichakul
Footballers at the 1968 Summer Olympics
Association football defenders
Vichai Sanghamkichakul